Driven to Fantasy is the second studio album by American singer and billboard model Angelyne, released in 1986 on her independent record label, Pink Kitten Records. It was her first musical release since her self-titled debut album (1982) and rise to fame caused by her self-promoting billboard campaign which made her a fixture on the Los Angeles scene. Produced by Angelyne and her guitar player David Pasarow, Driven to Fantasy is a dance-pop album with a strong influence of new wave music. Angelyne worked with Pasarow and Dale Carroll on writing the songs for the album.

Featuring four new songs and two dance mixes, Driven to Fantasy also included two previously released singles, "My List" and "Skin Tight" (first released in June 1983 by Erika Records.) In 1987, a re-issue of the album on a pink vinyl was released in Italy with a different track list. It included the songs "Sexy Stranger", "Rock 'n' Roll Rebel", "Emotional" and "Kiss Me L.A." that she had previously recorded with Jordan Michaels.

The cover sleeve was shot by Larry L. Lombardi. It depicts Angelyne leaning back on the hood of her infamous pink Chevrolet Corvette. The same image was used on her first billboard that went up on Sunset Boulevard in February 1984.

The record was and still is available through the official Angelyne fan club.

Track listings

Credits and personnel

Angelyne – vocals
David Pasarow – guitar, bass
Larry L. Lombardi – keyboards
John Buxnor – keyboards
Greg Carey – drums

Production
Producers: Angelyne, David Pasarow, Dale Carroll
Ron McMaster – mastering

Design
Larry L. Lombardi – photography
Bill Wittman – artistic layout

Special thanks
Hugo Maisnik, Audrey Sherwood, Nina Hagen, Rodney Bingenheimer

References

External links 
 

1986 albums
Angelyne albums